The 2023 Race of Champions was the 32nd running of the Race of Champions, taking place on 28 and 29 January. The race took place in Sweden for the second time in its history, taking place at Pite Havsbad in Piteå, Sweden, 60 miles south of the Arctic Circle, on a circuit of snow and ice on the frozen Baltic Sea.

The race was won by Team Norway (Oliver and Petter Solberg), which marked the team's second consecutive victory.

Participants

Nations Cup

Winners

Draw

Drivers 
The Champion of Champions winner was decided by a knockout tournament, split into two halves - one (upper half) consisting of international racing drivers with the other being the rally experts and 'those with more experience of off-road driving'. All rounds were the best of 2 heats, with the final being the best of 3 heats.

Preliminary round

Main Draw

Notes

References

External links
 

Race of Champions
Race of Champions
Race of Champions
Race of Champions
International sports competitions hosted by Sweden